Thanasis Topouzis (born 28 March 1992) is a Greek professional footballer who plays as a striker.

Club career

Youth career
He started his career in the youth teams of Iraklis, and was transferred to Aris in December 2010. He was a member, and second top scorer, of the team who won the U20 championship for Aris in 2011.

Senior career
He made his debut in the Greek Superleague during a home game against Atromitos, where he came as a substitute in the 78th minute. He moved in August 2012 to Lega Pro Seconda Divisione club Salernitana.

References

External links
 
Onsports.gr profile

1992 births
Living people
Greek footballers
Greek expatriate footballers
Greek expatriate sportspeople in Italy
Expatriate footballers in Italy
Super League Greece players
Aris Thessaloniki F.C. players
U.S. Salernitana 1919 players
Ascoli Calcio 1898 F.C. players
Association football forwards
Footballers from Thessaloniki
Agrotikos Asteras F.C. players
OFI Crete F.C. players
O.F. Ierapetra F.C. players